On Safari is a 2016 album by American southern rock band The Kentucky Headhunters. It was released on November 4, 2016 via Plowboy Records. The album includes mostly original compositions, along with covers of Alice Cooper's "Caught in a Dream" and Charlie Daniels's "Way Down Yonder".

Critical reception
Blues Blast magazine wrote that it was "a darn good album of blues influenced Southern rock". A positive review also came from Pure Grain Audio, which also praised the musicianship, Southern rock influences, and "winning formula".

Track listing
All tracks composed by The Kentucky Headhunters (Greg Martin, Doug Phelps, Fred Young, Richard Young), except as noted.

"Beaver Creek Mansion" (Mark S. Orr) - 4:08
"Deep South Blues Again" - 3:13
"I Am the Hunter" (D. Phelps, Martin, F. Young, R. Young, Ricky Lee Phelps) - 3:54
"Caught in a Dream" (Michael Bruce) - 3:28
"Crazy Jim" - 4:14
"Big Time" - 3:06
"Lowdown Memphis Town Blues" (Anthony Mattingly, Martin, D. Phelps, F. Young, R. Young) - 3:37
"Rainbow Shine" (Mattingly, Martin, D. Phelps, F. Young, R. Young) - 3:13
"Way Down Yonder" (Charlie Daniels) - 3:18
"Jukebox Full of Blues" - 2:09
"God Loves a Rolling Stone" - 3:32
"Governors Cup" - 1:59
instrumental

Personnel
Adapted from On Safari liner notes.
The Kentucky Headhunters
Kevin McKendree - piano, Hammond organ
Greg Martin - lead guitar, background vocals
Doug Phelps - lead vocals (all tracks except 2, 5, 6, 8, 12), background vocals, bass guitar
Fred Young - drums, percussion, background vocals
Richard Young - lead vocals (tracks 2, 5, 6, 8), background vocals, rhythm guitar

Technical
David Barrick - engineering
Jim DeMain - mastering
James David Glover - cover artist
The Kentucky Headhunters - producer

References

2016 albums
The Kentucky Headhunters albums